The 2005 Melbourne Cup was the 145th running of the Melbourne Cup, a prestigious Australian Thoroughbred horse race.

It was won by Makybe Diva at the age of seven, trained by Lee Freedman and ridden by Glen Boss. Makybe Diva broke her own weight carrying record by winning with 58 kg.  Makybe Diva is the only horse to win three successive Melbourne Cups. Her retirement was announced with the third and final victory.

Prize money

1st: $A3,700,000
2nd: $A750,000 
3rd: $A375,000

Results

Final moments
As they left the straight, round the turn and along the back straight it was:
 17 Umbula
 23 Mr Celebrity
 18 Bazelle
 14 Portland Singa

Changed to:
23 Mr Celebrity
18 Bazelle
17 Umbula
14 Portland Singa

Then:
23 Mr Celebrity
14 Portland Singa
18 Bazelle
17 Umbula

With about 1100m left to go it was:
23 Mr Celebrity
14 Portland Singa
17 Umbula
18 Bazelle

As they came to the turn:
23 Mr Celebrity
14 Portland Singa
17 Umbula
6 Eye Popper

Then:
23 Mr Celebrity
14 Portland Singa
6 Eye Popper
17 Umbula

With 500m left to go:
14 Portland Singa
23 Mr Celebrity
6 Eye Popper
13 Lachlan River

Final:
1 Makybe Diva
16 On a Jeune
8 Xcellent
22 Leica Falcon

Results

References

External links 
 Race video on YouTube

2005
Melbourne Cup
Melbourne Cup
2000s in Melbourne
November 2005 sports events in Australia